Torbeh Bar (also known as Torba Bera, Turbabar, Tūrbāvar, and Turbāwar) is a village in Chahar Farizeh Rural District, in the Central District of Bandar-e Anzali County, Gilan Province, Iran. At the 2006 census, its population was 329, in 110 families.

References 

Populated places in Bandar-e Anzali County